Ludovic Ferrière (born October 21, 1982 in Blois, France) is a geologist and curator of the meteorite collection and of the impactite collection at the Natural History Museum, Vienna, Austria. He is known for his research on meteorite impact craters.

Biography and career
Born in France in 1982, Ferrière developed an early interest in rocks and minerals. At the University of Tours (France), his passion for meteorite impact cratering was really born, so he spent a year at the University Laval (Quebec, Canada) to study geology and explore nearby craters during his spare time. Returning to France he did a one-year course on Planetology at the University of Nantes. Then, he completed a Master in Planetology at the Pierre and Marie Curie University in Paris (France), and learnt about meteorites at the Museum of Natural History. He finally completed his PhD thesis in Vienna (Austria) in 2009, on the geological and geochemical aspects of impactites from the Bosumtwi crater (Ghana), before to move again to Canada for his postdoctoral researches on shatter cones and associated shock-induced microdeformations in minerals (at the University of Western Ontario, London). 
Currently, Ferrière is the curator of the prestigious meteorite collection and of the impactite collection at the Natural History Museum Vienna.

Research
Ferrière’s research activities mainly center around the investigation of meteorites and impact craters. Together with colleagues, he contributed to the discovery and confirmation of five meteorite impact craters (i.e., Keurusselkä crater in Finland., Luizi crater in the Democratic Republic of Congo, Hummeln crater in Sweden, Yallalie crater in Australia, and Nova Colinas in Brazil ) and has also discovered and classified a number of meteorites (found in e.g., Egypt, Uruguay, Northwest Africa). 
In the framework of expeditions, Ferrière has explored a number of confirmed and possible (not yet confirmed) impact craters all around the Earth. Some of his expeditions, in more or less remote areas of the Earth, in his search for possible new meteorite impact craters and meteorites, were supported by National Geographic Society – Waitt Grants. One that was largely featured in the medias took place in the Democratic Republic of the Congo where Ferrière discovered and confirmed the impact origin of the Luizi crater

Ferrière is author and co-author of over 100 peer-reviewed research publications, over 200 abstracts presented at international conferences, and of a book on meteorites.

References

External links

 Natural History Museum in Vienna
 Austria in space
TEDx Talks: "Why to care about meteorites and impacts Ludovic Ferrière" https://www.youtube.com/watch?v=p1JjYl8YW6E . Retrieved  May 23, 2021.
Guinness World Records*https://www.guinnessworldrecords.com/about-us/partners/organisations/natural-history-museum-vienna . Retrieved  May 23, 2021.
L'OBS "Ludovic Ferrière, des cailloux de Blois aux météorites des Habsbourg" https://www.nouvelobs.com/culture/20140114.AFP7506/ludovic-ferriere-des-cailloux-de-blois-aux-meteorites-des-habsbourg.html . Retrieved  May 23, 2021.
The European Space Agency https://www.esa.int/esatv/Videos/2018/08/ESA_and_Asteroids/Soundbites_Ludovic_Ferriere_Curator_of_Collections_Natural_History_Museum_Vienna_French . Retrieved  May 23, 2021.
ORF Science: "Neues Mineral in Mondmeteoriten entdeckt" https://science.orf.at/stories/3202696/ . Retrieved  May 23, 2021.
ORF: "Einer der größten Mondsteine im NHM" https://wien.orf.at/stories/3062843/ . Retrieved  May 23, 2021.
Der Standard "Ein Himmelsgeschenk für Österreich" https://www.derstandard.at/story/2000080696238/ein-himmelsgeschenk-fuer-oesterreich . Retrieved  May 23, 2021.
EL PAÍS "Un Indiana Jones francés protege el meteorito oficialmente uruguayo" https://www.elpais.com.uy/vida-actual/indiana-jones-frances-protege-meteorito-oficialmente-uruguayo.html . Retrieved  May 23, 2021.
Le Populaire du Centre "Ludovic Ferrière : profession, découvreur de météorites" 
ORCID https://orcid.org/0000-0002-9082-6230 . Retrieved  May 23, 2021.
L'EXPRESS "Ludovic Ferrière, des cailloux de Blois aux météorites des Habsbourg" https://www.lexpress.fr/actualites/1/culture/ludovic-ferriere-des-cailloux-de-blois-aux-meteorites-des-habsbourg_1313997.html . Retrieved  May 23, 2021.
University of Vienna https://ufind.univie.ac.at/en/person.html?id=28391 . Retrieved  May 23, 2021.
Austria in Space "Ein Blick auf: Dr. Ludovic Ferrière/NHM" https://austria-in-space.at/de/portraits/ludovic-ferriere-portraet.php . Retrieved  May 23, 2021.

French geologists
1982 births
Scientists from Blois
University of Tours alumni
Pierre and Marie Curie University alumni
Living people